I Passed for White is a 1960 film directed and adapted for the screen by Fred M. Wilcox from a novel of the same name by Reba Lee "as told to" Mary Hastings Bradley. The film stars Sonya Wilde and James Franciscus and features Jimmy Lydon, Patricia Michon, and Isabel Cooley. It was released by Allied Artists on March 18, 1960.

Plot
Bernice Lee (Sonya Wilde) is a young woman of mixed African and European ancestry, living in Chicago with her family, and she is mistaken for a fully white woman by a white man, who tries to hit on her repeatedly. Her brother, more obviously of mixed heritage, fights off the man. Bernice's grandmother consoles her when she confides her troubles.

After a failed attempt at looking for employment as a black woman, she decides to leave town. She begins to use the name Lila Brownell and live as a white woman. On the plane to New York City, she meets and eventually marries the man of her dreams – Rick Leyton (James Franciscus) – and fails to mention her African ancestry, an important omission as interracial marriage is not a constitutional right in 1960. Rick and his wealthy family and friends are white. Her white friend Sally (Patricia Michon) and black maid Bertha (Isabel Cooley) both advise her not to tell him. She becomes pregnant, and fears the child will have black features or coloring – and gets a book to read about this unlikely possibility, which she hides. Rick eventually discovers it, and their maid claims the book belongs to her.

Lila goes into premature labor and has a stillborn child, but cries out "Is the baby black?" after she awakens from anesthesia. This leads Rick to suspect that his wife has been unfaithful. Eventually, she and her husband divorce without Bernice's having revealed her true name or past. She then returns to her family in Chicago and her original identity.

The ending is an example of the tragic mulatto trope.

Cast
Sonya Wilde as Bernice Lee / Lila Brownell
James Franciscus as Rick Leyton
Patricia Michon as Sally Roberts
Elizabeth Council as Ann Leyton
Griffin Crafts as Mr. Leyton
Isabel Cooley as Bertha
Jimmy Lydon as Jay Morgan
Thomas Browne Henry as Dr. Merritt
Max Mellinger as Mr. Gordon
Phyllis Cole as nurse
Calvin Jackson as Eddie, in Dance School
Lon Ballantyne as Chuck
Temple Hatton as Eddie, Friend of Bernice
Freita Shaw as Gram
Vampira as Girl Poet
Edmund Hashim as Club Patron
Ray Kellogg as bartender

Production
A white actress was cast as the producers felt many White audience members would not want to see an inter-racial relationship between two actors on the screen.

Reception
Eugene Archer of The New York Times stated that it was "low-budget" and used "tabloid sensationalism"; he concluded that it was "Amateurishly written, directed and played".
 
Although similar in story arc, Janine Bradbury of The Guardian stated that it "failed to match the success of  Imitation of Life."

See also
 List of American films of 1960
 Tragic mulatto

References
Notes

External links
 

1960 films
1960 romantic drama films
American black-and-white films
1960s English-language films
Films scored by John Williams
Films based on American novels
Films directed by Fred M. Wilcox
Films about race and ethnicity
American romantic drama films
1960s American films